Martinsburg may refer to:

Places
In the United States:

Martinsburg, Indiana
Martinsburg, Iowa
Sandy Hook, Kentucky, originally incorporated as Martinsburg
Martinsburg, Missouri
Martinsburg, Ripley County, Missouri
Martinsburg, Nebraska
Martinsburg, New York
Martinsburg, Ohio
Martinsburg, Pennsylvania
Martinsburg, West Virginia

In Germany:
Martinsburg, Mainz, a fortress which was demolished in 1809 (see Electoral Palace Mainz)